McLean Boulevard may refer to:

McLean Boulevard (Baltimore)
New Jersey Route 20